Taurometopa is a genus of moths of the family Crambidae.

Species
Taurometopa aryrostrota (Hampson, 1917)
Taurometopa haematographa (Hampson, 1917)
Taurometopa phoenicozona (Hampson, 1917)
Taurometopa pulverea (Hampson, 1917)
Taurometopa pyrometalla Meyrick, 1933

Former species
Taurometopa calamistis (Hampson, 1917)
Taurometopa inimicella (Zeller, 1872)

References

Natural History Museum Lepidoptera genus database

Odontiinae
Crambidae genera
Taxa named by Edward Meyrick